Lewis Edward "Buddy" Gremp (August 5, 1919 in Denver, Colorado – January 20, 1995 in Manteca, California) was a professional baseball player who played infielder in the Major Leagues from 1940 to 1942. He played for the Boston Braves.

External links

1919 births
1995 deaths
Major League Baseball infielders
Boston Braves players
Baseball players from Denver